John Robert Dopson, Jr. (born July 14, 1963) is a former professional baseball player who pitched in the Major Leagues from 1985 and 1988 to 1994.  He was the last pitcher to balk four times in one game, a feat he achieved on June 13, 1989. Primarily a starter, Dopson recorded his only career save during his last season of 1994.

See also
 Montreal Expos all-time roster

References

External links

1963 births
Living people
American expatriate baseball players in Canada
Baseball players from Baltimore
Boston Red Sox players
California Angels players
Indianapolis Indians players
Jacksonville Expos players
Jacksonville Suns players
Jamestown Expos players
Major League Baseball pitchers
Montreal Expos players
Pawtucket Red Sox players
Tennessee Tomahawks players
Tri-City Posse players
West Palm Beach Expos players
Winter Haven Red Sox players